The Wood method, also known as the Merchant–Rankine–Wood method, is a structural analysis method which was developed to determine estimates for the effective buckling length of a compressed member included in a building frames, both in sway and a non-sway buckling modes.  It is named after R. H. Wood.

The redistribution coefficients are obtained through the following expressions:

where  are the stiffness coefficients for the adjacent length of columns.

Although this method was included in ENV 1993-1-1:1992, it is absent from EN 1993-1-1.

See also
 EN 1993
 Merchant–Rankine method
 Horne method

References

Structural analysis